Elmer Bragg Adams (October 27, 1842 – October 24, 1916) was a United States circuit judge of the United States Court of Appeals for the Eighth Circuit and of the United States Circuit Courts for the Eighth Circuit and previously was a United States district judge of the United States District Court for the Eastern District of Missouri.

Education and career

Adams was born on October 27, 1842, in Pomfret, Vermont, a lineal descendant of Henry Adams of Braintree, Massachusetts. He received a Bachelor of Arts degree from Yale University in 1865 and graduated from Harvard Law School in 1868. He was a teacher for the American Union Commission in Georgia from 1865 to 1866, and then engaged in the private practice of law in St. Louis, Missouri, from 1866 to 1879. He was a state court judge of the St. Louis Circuit Court from 1879 to 1884, thereafter returning to private practice in St. Louis until 1895. He also received the degree LL.D. from the University of Missouri in 1896.

Federal judicial service

Adams received a recess appointment from President Grover Cleveland on May 17, 1895, to a seat on the United States District Court for the Eastern District of Missouri vacated by Judge Henry Samuel Priest. He was nominated to the same position by President Cleveland on December 4, 1895. He was confirmed by the United States Senate on December 9, 1895, and received his commission the same day. His service terminated on May 29, 1905, due to his elevation to the Eighth Circuit.

Adams received a recess appointment from President Theodore Roosevelt on May 20, 1905, to a joint seat on the United States Court of Appeals for the Eighth Circuit and the United States Circuit Courts for the Eighth Circuit vacated by Judge Amos Madden Thayer. He was nominated to the same position by President Roosevelt on December 5, 1905. He was confirmed by the Senate on December 12, 1905, and received his commission the same day. On December 31, 1911, the Circuit Courts were abolished and he thereafter served only on the Court of Appeals. His service terminated on October 24, 1916, due to his death in St. Louis.

Personal life

Adams was married to Emma Richmond of Woodstock, Vermont in 1870.

References

Sources
  
 
 

1842 births
1916 deaths
People from Pomfret, Vermont
Yale University alumni
Harvard Law School alumni
Missouri state court judges
Judges of the United States District Court for the Eastern District of Missouri
Judges of the United States Court of Appeals for the Eighth Circuit
United States federal judges appointed by Grover Cleveland
19th-century American judges
United States court of appeals judges appointed by Theodore Roosevelt
20th-century American judges
Judges of the United States circuit courts